Identity Thief is a 2013 American road comedy film directed by Seth Gordon, written by Craig Mazin from a story by Mazin and Jerry Eeten, and starring Jason Bateman and Melissa McCarthy. The film tells the fictional story of Sandy Patterson, a man whose identity is stolen by a female con artist. After the police told him that it will take up to a year to solve the case, Sandy embarks on a cross-country road trip to find her and clear his name.

The film received negative reception from critics, but was a commercial success, grossing over $174 million worldwide against a budget of $35 million.

Plot
In Denver, Sandy Patterson is tricked into buying phony identity theft protection from Diana, a Florida con artist, over the phone and he reveals all of his personal information. At work, after Sandy clashes with his obnoxious boss, Harold Cornish, he receives a phone call that reminds him he has an appointment at a salon in Florida. Confused, he puts it out of his mind when co-worker Daniel Casey suggests they and several others leave Cornish and start their own firm; Sandy agrees to join them.

When paying for gas, Sandy's card is declined, and the clerk cuts it up. As the credit card company tells him that he has spent thousands of dollars in Florida, he is arrested for missing a court date there. At the Denver police station, Detective Reilly determines Diana has stolen Sandy's identity. The situation worsens when cops ask Daniel, now his boss, about Sandy's alleged possession of drugs. Reilly says Sandy's name was used to buy drugs from someone named Paolo. When the cops say they can do nothing unless the identity thief is in Denver, Sandy offers to retrieve her and convince her to clear his name despite his wife's concerns.

Sandy finds Diana at the salon in Winter Park, Florida, but when he confronts her, she steals his rental car. Finding her address in her abandoned car, he investigates her house, which is full of merchandise and stolen credit cards. The pair scuffle; before Sandy can handcuff her, criminals Marisol and Julian burst in, angry that Diana gave Paolo bad credit cards. After Sandy and Diana escape, Sandy tells her about his plan to restore his reputation, and she agrees to help. Meanwhile, a skiptracer is dispatched to track down Diana for a substantial bounty. Because their IDs are identical, flight is impossible, and they travel by car.

After traveling through several states, the skiptracer catches up to the pair and captures Diana. A chase ensues; she knocks him unconscious, and Sandy rams his van off the road. They take the skiptracer's van and tie him up in back. When it overheats, they continue on foot through a forest. Sandy discards his pants when he finds a snake in them, and Diana accidentally knocks him unconscious when another bites his neck. Sandy wakes at a bus station, and Diana says she carried him until she flagged down a truck. As the next bus to Denver leaves in three days, Sandy uses money hidden in his socks to buy a $200 car. For gas money, the pair con an accounts processor and steal Cornish's identity to create new credit cards. Meanwhile, Marisol shoots the skiptracer, and the criminals continue their pursuit of Sandy and Diana.

In St. Louis, the two share dinner, and Diana admits she does not know her real name. The accounts processor enters with cops, who arrest Sandy and Diana. Diana uncuffs herself in the back of the police car, breaks the back windshield, and escapes with Sandy. The skiptracer shoots Marisol and Julian, finds Diana and Sandy on the highway mid-escape, and hits Diana with his car. Sandy comes to her aid, but Diana revives and defensively strikes Sandy in the throat. Diana and Sandy eventually get home, where Diana has dinner with Sandy's family and reconciles with them. Sandy and Trish have a private conversation that night, agreeing not to turn in Diana even if it means that Sandy will lose his job.

The next morning, Sandy finds Diana gone and a note that apologizes for the trouble she caused. Sandy prepares to quit his job, but Daniel shows him that Diana is meeting with the police in an office. Detective Reilly tells Sandy he is no longer part of the investigation, and Diana is taken away in cuffs. Before she leaves, Sandy asks her why; Diana says she knew he would not turn her in, but it was the right thing to do.

One year later, Sandy celebrates another birthday, this time with his third child. The family visits Diana in prison, and Sandy presents her with a birth certificate that reveals her name as Dawn Budgie. Diana hugs Sandy. When a guard antagonizes her, Diana punches the guard, and another guard stuns her with a Taser. As she recovers and walks back to her cell, Sandy watches with a shocked expression.

Cast

 Jason Bateman as Sandy Patterson, a Denver accountant 
 Melissa McCarthy as Diana / Dawn Budgie, a con artist living in Florida
 Amanda Peet as Trish Patterson, Sandy's wife
 Jon Favreau as Harold Cornish, Sandy's Chief Executive 
 John Cho as Daniel Casey, Sandy's colleague and subsequently his boss
 Génesis Rodríguez as Marisol, a criminal 
 T.I. as Julian, a criminal 
 Morris Chestnut as Detective Reilly, a Denver detective
 Robert Patrick as Skiptracer, a freelance bounty hunter and skip tracers
 Eric Stonestreet as Big Chuck, a real estate agent and short-term love interest for Diana
 Mary-Charles Jones as Franny Patterson, Sandy and Trish's daughter 
 Maggie Elizabeth Jones as Jessie Patterson, Sandy and Trish's daughter 
 Jonathan Banks as Paolo Gordon, a crime boss who runs his enterprise from jail
 Carlos Navarro as Luis the Gas Station Attendant, the retail clerk who cuts Sandy's credit card
 Ben Falcone as Tony
 Kevin Covais as Kevin
 Ellie Kemper as Flo (uncredited)
 Carmela Zumbado as the Salon Saleperson (uncredited)
 Clark Duke as Everett (uncredited)

Production

Casting
The film was first conceived as a project with two male leads, but that changed when Bateman saw McCarthy in Bridesmaids and pushed for her to star alongside him. Jerry Eeten wrote an early draft, later finished by Craig Mazin with a final rewrite by Seth Gordon. In January 2012, Gordon was announced as the director of the film with Scott Stuber producing through his Stuber Pictures banner with Bateman and Peter Morgan for DumbDumb. In April 2012, John Cho, Clark Duke and Amanda Peet joined the cast. In May 2012, Jon Favreau and Morris Chestnut also joined the cast.

Filming
Some filming took place in Atlanta at the 191 Peachtree Tower, around May 2012. Scenes were also filmed on Peachtree Street in Midtown Atlanta, at The Colonnade restaurant on Cheshire Bridge Road in Morningside, and at Perimeter Mall. Scenes from the film were also shot at Salon 2000 in Ansley Mall.

Release
In March 2012, a release date of May 10, 2013 was announced. In June 2012, the release date changed to February 8, 2013.

Marketing
The first official full-length trailer of the film was released on September 26, 2012.

Box office
Identity Thief has grossed $134.5 million in the USA & Canada, and $39.5 million in other countries, for a worldwide total of $174 million against a budget of $35 million.

Identity Thief opened at #1 at the box office with $34.5 million in its first weekend, which was considered remarkable by analysts since a major winter storm, often a concern with winter dump months releases, forced theater closings and kept moviegoers at home in the densely populated Northeast. The film held the #2 spot in its second weekend, grossing $27.5 million and only dropping 20.5%. It reclaimed the #1 spot in its third week opening.

Reception

Critical response
On Rotten Tomatoes the film has an approval rating of 19% based on 178 reviews with an average rating of 4.2/10. The site's critical consensus reads, "Identity Thiefs few laughs are attributable to Melissa McCarthy and Jason Bateman, who labor mightily to create a framework for the movie's undisciplined plotline". On Metacritic, the film has a score of 35 out of 100 based on 41 critics, indicating "generally unfavorable reviews". Audiences polled by CinemaScore gave the film an average grade of "B" on an A+ to F scale.

R. Kurt Osenlund of Slant Magazine gave the film a positive review, rating it 3 out of 4 stars, praising McCarthy's performance, writing that she "gives a performance leagues better than anything to be expected in a mainstream, early-in-the-year release, padding a typically sketched character with layers of hilarity and pathos. McCarthy owns 'Identity Thief' with a turn of limitless surprise, making an otherwise adequate comedy soar as a star vehicle. She is riveting in simply-penned moments of remorse and confession, adding tearful depth to her ace timing and formidable physical comedy."
Peter Debruge of Variety magazine praises McCarthy but criticizes the script, saying "Melissa McCarthy proves she’s got what it takes to carry a feature, however meager the underlying material."
Richard Roeper of the Chicago Sun-Times gave the film 2/4 and wrote: "It wants to be "Midnight Run" meets "Planes, Trains and Automobiles," but it carries little of the dramatic heft and real-world semi-plausibility of those much superior efforts." He concludes "Here's hoping someone finds a much better vehicle for these terrifically talented actors."

Bob Mondello for NPR described the film as "Two Hours Stolen", calling it "a catalog of missed opportunities", and "uninspired trudge of a road movie". Mondello particularly criticizes the script for wasting the talented lead performers, setting up Bateman as stupid and dull, while subverting McCarthy's improvisational skills and undercutting her comic timing with interruptions.
James Berardinelli of ReelViews.com gave the film 1/4 and wrote: "This feels a lot like some of the recent, unwatchable Adam Sandler offerings: boorish, unfunny comedy colliding with saccharine, quasi-dramatic filler." He thought the trailer was a fair representation of the film and that viewers that liked it might get more than the few chuckles he got out of the film. Berardinelli says the film is not simply bad but 
manages to "cross the line into reprehensible."
Dana Stevens at Slate.com considers the implications of the “brazenly grotesque" character that McCarthy plays and how it is an uneasy balance between feminist trailblazing and preservation of stereotypes. Stevens would be more willing to forgive the film for "its overfamiliar comic setups and shameless gag-recycling if the movie’s second half didn’t make such an abrupt about-face from soliciting our revulsion to begging for our pity."

In his negative review, Rex Reed made several references to Melissa McCarthy's weight, referring to her as "tractor-sized," "humongous," "obese," and a "hippo," Reed's comments immediately attracted wide criticism from various film critics and the film industry at large. Film critic Richard Roeper said, "This just smacks of mean-spirited name-calling in lieu of genuine criticism." On Twitter, Paul Feig, who directed McCarthy in Bridesmaids and The Heat, wrote, "I cordially invite Mr. Rex Reed to go fuck himself." The review was referenced at the 85th Academy Awards on February 24, 2013 by the host, Seth MacFarlane, who joked that Reed would review Adele for singing "Skyfall" at the ceremony. In a column for The Huffington Post, Candy Spelling likened Reed's review to bullying. Reed stood by his comments and stated his objection to the use of serious health issues such as obesity as comedy talking points. He dismissed the outrage as being orchestrated for publicity, but praised McCarthy for not getting involved in the matter, calling her "completely classy." McCarthy later responded, expressing surprise the review was published, and said "I felt really bad for someone who is swimming in so much hate. I just thought, that’s someone who’s in a really bad spot, and I am in such a happy spot. I laugh my head off every day with my husband and my kids".

Accolades

References

External links

 
 
 
 

2013 films
2013 comedy films
2010s crime comedy films
2010s comedy road movies
American comedy road movies
American crime comedy films
Films about identity theft
Films directed by Seth Gordon
Films produced by Scott Stuber
Films scored by Christopher Lennertz
Films set in Colorado
Films set in Denver
Films set in Georgia (U.S. state)
Films set in St. Louis
Films shot in Atlanta
Films shot in Colorado
Relativity Media films
Universal Pictures films
2010s English-language films
2010s American films
Films with screenplays by Craig Mazin